The discography of Thrice consists of eleven studio albums, two live albums, two compilation albums, five EPs, ten singles, and fifteen music videos.

Thrice formed in 1998 in Irvine, California. They released Identity Crisis in 2001 and The Illusion of Safety in 2002 through the independent label Sub City Records—an imprint of Hopeless Records. Shortly thereafter, Thrice signed to the major label Island Records and released their most commercially successful album The Artist in the Ambulance in 2003. The album spawned the two radio singles "All That's Left" and "Stare at the Sun" in addition to the promotional single "Under a Killing Moon". In 2005, Thrice released Vheissu again through Island.

In 2007, Thrice signed to Vagrant Records to release their multi-EP project The Alchemy Index. The first two EPs were released as The Alchemy Index Vols. I & II in 2007, and the final two EPs were released as The Alchemy Index Vols. III & IV in 2008. This project was followed by 2009's Beggars. Thrice released their seventh studio album, Major/Minor, in September 2011.

Studio albums

Live albums

Compilation albums

EPs

Singles

Other appearances
The following Thrice songs were released on compilation albums, soundtracks, and other releases. This is not an exhaustive list; songs that were first released on the band's albums, EPs, and singles are not included.

Music videos

References
Notes
A  If We Could Only See Us Now was certified gold by the RIAA on December 6, 2005 as a video longform album.
B  The Alchemy Index was a limited edition vinyl box set of all four EPs from the Alchemy Index project.
C  The song "Under the Killing Moon" was released as a split-single with Thursday's "For the Workforce Drowning" from their 2003 album War All the Time, which was also released by Island Records.

References

External links
 Thrice discography at Discogs
 Thrice discography at Rate Your Music

Rock music group discographies
Discographies of American artists